The women's competition in 48 kg division was staged on September 17, 2007.

Schedule

Medalists

Records

Results

References
Results 

Women's 48
World